Marco Marzano (born 10 June 1980 in Cuggiono, Milan) is an Italian former professional road bicycle racer, who competed as a professional between 2005 and 2012.

Major results

 Baby Giro – 1 stage & Overall (2004)
 3rd, National Amateur Road Race Championship (2004)
 Giro della Valle d'Aosta – 1 stage & Overall (2003)

References

External links 
 

1980 births
Living people
People from Cuggiono
Italian male cyclists
Cyclists from the Metropolitan City of Milan